The JW Marriott Marquis Dubai Hotel is the world's second tallest hotel, a 72-storey,  twin-tower skyscraper complex in Dubai, United Arab Emirates.  The AED1.8 billion complex features a 1,608-room hotel run by Marriott International.

History
This project, owned by the Emirates Group, was originally conceived as a single, 77-storey tower intended to be completed in 2008 and built alongside the Sheikh Zayed Road. However, its design and location had to be changed because of the construction of a creek extension belonging to the Business Bay megaproject. The new twin-tower design was launched at the Arabian Travel Market in Dubai in 2006 with  towers. The concrete structural frames of both towers topped out in April 2010. By April 2011, the spires on both towers had been added and the outer structure of both towers almost completed. The buildings were completed in 2012, surpassing the Rose Rayhaan by Rotana as the world's tallest hotel.

With the first tower open, the hotel comprises 14 food and beverage outlets, rooftop bars, a business center, conference halls and meeting rooms, an extensive banquet hall, a  spa and health club, as well as retail outlets, a swimming pool, and a gymnasium.

The 2B+G+82 storey twin towers were completed in November 2012.

The hotel has 1364 standard guest rooms, 240 suites, 4 "presidential suites", a banquet hall, an auditorium, 18 Shops, 19 restaurants and a spa.

The form is inspired by the date palm. The towers are symmetrically placed on the 7-storey high podium to get views of the Burj Khalifa, Business Bay and the sea. The podium houses all the public areas, restaurants, banquet hall and back of house areas. The entrance lobby is 4 floors high and overlooks the Business Bay. The 1,000 capacity banquet hall has an independent access. The podium terrace has one of the largest spas in Dubai and is landscaped with gardens and swimming pool.

Architect Ashok Korgaonkar, founder and principal architect of Archgroup International Consultants designed the J W Marriott Marquis.

Gallery

See also
List of tallest buildings in Dubai
List of tallest buildings in the United Arab Emirates
List of tallest twin buildings and structures in the world
List of tallest hotels in the world

References

https://www.designbuild-network.com/projects/jw-marriott-marquis-hotel/

External links

JW Marriott Hotels
Skyscraper hotels in Dubai
Hotel buildings completed in 2012
The Emirates Group
Twin towers
High-tech architecture
Neomodern architecture
Hotel buildings completed in 2013
Hotels established in 2012
Retail buildings in the United Arab Emirates
2012 establishments in the United Arab Emirates